Attack of the Mutant Camels is a surrealist computer game written by Jeff Minter and released for the Commodore 64 and Atari 8-bit family in 1983 by Minter's Llamasoft. The horizontally scrolling shooter is similar to the Atari 2600 game The Empire Strikes Back (1982), with AT-AT walkers replaced by giant camels. Confusingly, a very different game from Jeff Minter's Gridrunner series was also released in the US under the name Attack of the Mutant Camels.

Llamasoft released a sequel, Revenge of the Mutant Camels, in 1984.

Gameplay

The player controls a small jet plane and has the task of killing giant yellow camels before they reach the home base. Doing so requires several dozens of shots. The camels retaliate by shooting fireballs from their mouths. If a camel reaches the base, the game is lost. Once all camels on a level are killed, the player has to survive a "hyperspace" sequence which requires avoiding high-speed missiles. Upon successful completion, the next level presents a new wave of camels, with slightly harder gameplay.

Legacy
In 2011, Attack of the Mutant Camels was chosen to be featured in the Smithsonian Institution's "The Art of Video Games" exhibit.

In 2012 the assembly language source code of the Konix version of the game was released on GitHub.

References

External links 
 Attack of the Mutant Camels at Atari Mania
 
 Llamasoft's 8-bit games, from which AMC is downloadable
 https://web.archive.org/web/20120319051045/http://c64s.com/game/94/attack_of_the_mutant_camels/
 

1983 video games
Commodore 64 games
Atari 8-bit family games
Horizontally scrolling shooters
Llamasoft games
Commercial video games with freely available source code
Video game clones
Video games developed in the United Kingdom
Video games about animals
Fictional camelids